Yatay may be,

Butia yatay, the yatay palm
Yatay language
Battle of Yatay